Macropodium is a genus of flowering plants belonging to the family Brassicaceae.

Its native range is Central Asia to Russian Far East and Mongolia.

Species
Species:

Macropodium nivale 
Macropodium pterospermum

References

Brassicaceae
Brassicaceae genera